The Italian Women's Volleyball Cup in (Italian : Coppa Italia di Pallavolo Femminile ) is an Italian women's Volleyball competition held every year Organized since the year 1979 by the Lega Pallavolo Serie A femminile the 1st tier clubs advanced automatically to the 16 Round knock out playoffs.

Competition history

Winners list

Honours by Club

References

External links
  Italian Volleyball Federation  
 Legavolleyfemminile.it 

Volleyball in Italy